Jaclyn Bethany is an American director, writer, producer and actress. She is best known for her work on The Rehearsal, Indigo Valley and The Delta Girl.

Life and career
Bethany was born in Jackson, Mississippi. She holds a BA in Acting from Fordham University and an MA in Screenwriting from the London Film School. Later, she also received a Master of Fine Arts degree from the AFI Conservatory. Her thesis film, The Delta Girl, starring Isabelle Fuhrman, Caitlin Carver and Ashley Bell, premiered at HollyShorts Film Festival.

Bethany's debut feature film, Indigo Valley, starring Rosie Day, Brandon Sklenar and Greta Bellamacina, based on one of her own short film of the same name. It was screened at the Garden State Film Festival. Her digital series The Rehearsal won the Daytime Emmy Award for Outstanding Performance by a Supporting Actress in a Digital Drama Series for Tina Benko. She is slated to direct the upcoming feature film Before the World Set on Fire, starring Brooke Bloom and Samuel H. Levine.

Filmography 

As actress

 2015 - Olivia Martha Ilse
 2016 - The Devil's Dolls
 2016 - Blindness
 2016 - Miles
 2016 - Resistance
 2016 - Dear Annabel
 2016 - Between Departures

 2017 - Good Luck Marc
 2017 - Indigo Valley
 2017 - Mojave
 2017 - In: Transit
 2019 - Moth
 2019 - The Rehearsal
 2020 - Indigo Valley
 2021 - mank

References

External links
 

Living people
American film directors
American women film producers
American women film directors
American women screenwriters
American film actresses
AFI Conservatory alumni
Year of birth missing (living people)
21st-century American women